Thomas F. Catapano (August 16, 1949 – May 22, 2005) was an American politician who served in the New York State Assembly from the 54th district from 1983 to 1992.

References

1949 births
2005 deaths
Democratic Party members of the New York State Assembly
20th-century American politicians